Anumandai is a village panchayat located in the Marakkanam Taluk, Viluppuram district, Tamil Nadu, India. It is one of the village panchayats coming under Marakkanam block of Viluppuram district.

Businesses 

Anumandai has two banks namely, Pallavan Grama Bank and Co-operative Bank.

References

External links 
 

Villages in Viluppuram district